The Defileul Jiului National Park is a protected area (national park category II IUCN) situated in Romania on the administrative territory of counties Gorj (92%) and Hunedoara (8%).

Location 
The National Park is located along the gorge formed by the Jiu River between the Vâlcan Mountains and Parâng Mountains (subgroup of mountains in the Southern Carpathians) in the northern part of Gorj county.

Description 
Defileul Jiului National Park with an area of 11.127 ha was declared protected area by the Government Decision Number 1581 in 2005 (published in Romanian Official Paper Number 38 on January 12, 2006) and represents an area what shelters a large variety of flora and fauna.

References 

National parks of Romania
Geography of Gorj County
Geography of Hunedoara County
Protected areas established in 2005
Tourist attractions in Gorj County
Tourist attractions in Hunedoara County